Pierre George Deslondes, last name sometimes spelled Deslonde (born ca. 1825) was an African-American sugar planter who served as Secretary of State of Louisiana during the Reconstruction era. He was a wealthy freeman. He served as secretary of state from 1872 until 1876. He later published the News Pioneer in Plaquemine. He owned $55,000 worth of property in 1860.

He was the son of George Deslondes (died July 7, 854) and Eloise Belly. Odile and Victoria were his siblings.

He filed a petition in 1859. He was a Republican organizer in Iberville Parish.

See also
African-American officeholders during and following the Reconstruction era

References

1820s births
African-American politicians during the Reconstruction Era
American freedmen
19th-century American newspaper publishers (people)
Secretaries of State of Louisiana
19th-century American landowners